Luigi Croce (born 27 November 1940) is an Italian former yacht racer who competed in the 1964 Summer Olympics.

References

1940 births
Living people
Italian male sailors (sport)
Olympic sailors of Italy
Sailors at the 1964 Summer Olympics – Star